Jenkins Homestead is a historic home located at Lansdale, Montgomery County, Pennsylvania.  It was built about 1805, and is a -story, five bay, stucco over stone dwelling.  It has two front entryways, one entering onto a through central hallway.  It is the oldest structure in Lansdale.

It was added to the National Register of Historic Places in 1977.

References

Houses on the National Register of Historic Places in Pennsylvania
Houses completed in 1805
Houses in Montgomery County, Pennsylvania
1805 establishments in Pennsylvania
National Register of Historic Places in Montgomery County, Pennsylvania
Lansdale, Pennsylvania